Rupert Law (24 February 1890 – 5 May 1942) was an Australian cricketer. He played in two first-class matches for Queensland in 1912/13.

See also
 List of Queensland first-class cricketers

References

External links
 

1890 births
1942 deaths
Australian cricketers
Queensland cricketers
Cricketers from Sydney